The Yin Yang Shiyi Mai Jiujing, or Cauterization Canon of the Eleven Yin and Yang Vessels, is an ancient Chinese medical text that was excavated in 1973 from a Han-dynasty tomb in Mawangdui Han tombs site (Hunan province) that had been sealed in 168 BCE. It was handcopied in seal script on the same sheet of silk as the Recipes for Fifty-Two Ailments and another text on cauterization during the Qin dynasty, around 215 BCE. The text describes the pathways of eleven vessels or channels (mai ) inside the body, as well as the ailments associated with each vessel. It contains many textual parallels with the later medical text known as the Lingshu, one extant version of the Huangdi Neijing.

See also
Zubi Shiyi Mai Jiujing
Jinkui Yaolue
Wushi'er Bingfang

Notes

Bibliography

.

Chinese medical texts
History of ancient medicine
Medical manuals